Convoy JW 54B was an Arctic convoy sent from Great Britain by the Western Allies to aid the Soviet Union during World War II. It sailed in late November 1943, reaching the Soviet northern ports at the end of the month. All ships arrived safely.

Forces
The convoy consisted of 15 merchant ships which departed from Loch Ewe on 22 November 1943.
Close escort was led by the destroyer Beagle and comprised three corvettes and a minesweeper. These were supported by an Ocean escort of eight Home Fleet destroyers led by Hardy.
The convoy was also accompanied initially by a local escort group from Britain.
A cruiser cover force comprising Kent, Jamaica and Bermuda also followed the convoy, to guard against attack by surface units. 
Distant cover was provided by a Heavy Cover Force comprising the battleship Anson, the cruiser Belfast and four  destroyers.

JW 54B was opposed by a U-boat force of five boats in a patrol line, code-named Eisenbart, in the Norwegian Sea.
A surface force comprising the battleship Scharnhorst and five destroyers was also available, stationed at Altenfjord.

Voyage
JW 54B departed Loch Ewe on 22 November 1943, accompanied by its local escort, of three destroyers and a minesweeper, and its close escort.
Three days later, on 25 November, it was joined by the ocean escort, while the local escort departed. At the same time the Cruiser Force and the Distant Cover Force, which were already at sea covering convoy JW 54A, were on station in the Norwegian Sea.

The convoy was not sighted by German reconnaissance aircraft, nor by any of the Eisenbart U-boats, and crossed the Norwegian and Barents Seas without incident.

On 3 December the Ocean escort destroyers departed, to make independent passage home, while JW 54B arrived safely at Archangel later the same day.

Conclusion
JW 54B  saw the safe arrival of 15 merchant ships and the war materiel they carried. Together with the 19 ships of JW 54A, which had arrived at Murmansk the previous week; this was a successful start to the 1943–44 convoy season.

Ships involved

Allied ships

Merchant ships

 Arthur L Perry
 Daldorich
 Empire Lionel
 Empire Stalwart
 Eugene Field
 Fort Columbia
 Fort McMurray

 Fort Poplar
 Horace Gray
 John Fitch
 Ocean Strength
 Rathlin
 San Adolfo
 Thomas Kearns
 William L Marcy

Close escort
 Beagle 
 Dianella
 Poppy
 Rhodedendron
 Halcyon

Ocean escort
 Hardy
 Saumarez
 Savage
 Scorpion
 Scourge
 Stord
 
 Vigilant

Cruiser cover force
 Kent (flag)
 Jamaica
 Bermuda

Distant cover force
 Anson (flag)
 Belfast
 Ashanti
 Matchless
 Musketeer
 Obdurate

Axis ships

U-boat force
 U-277 
 U-307
 U-354
 U-360
 U-387

Surface force
 Scharnhorst
 Z29
 Z30
 Z33
 Z34
 Z38

Notes

References
 Clay Blair : Hitler's U-Boat War [Volume 2]: The Hunted 1942–1945 (1998)  (2000 UK paperback ed.)
 Paul Kemp : Convoy! Drama in Arctic Waters (1993) 
 Paul Kemp  : U-Boats Destroyed  ( 1997).  
 Axel Neistle  : German U-Boat Losses during World War II  (1998). 
 Bob Ruegg, Arnold Hague : Convoys to Russia (1992) 
 Bernard Schofield : (1964) The Russian Convoys BT Batsford  ISBN (none)
  JW 54B at Convoyweb

JW 54B